538 km is a rural locality (a passing loop) in Kalarskoye Rural Settlement of Tashtagolsky District, Russia. The  population was 8 as of 2010.

Streets 
 Lesnaya

Geography 
538 km is located 32 km northwest of Tashtagol (the district's administrative centre) by road. 534 km is the nearest rural locality.

References 

Rural localities in Kemerovo Oblast